DOP El Terrerazo is a Spanish geographical indication for Vino de Pago wines produced in the estate of El Terrerazo located in the municipality of Utiel, in the province of Valencia in the autonomous community of Valencia, Spain. The sole proprietor of this estate is Bodega Mustiguillo .

Vino de Pago is the largest category in the wine quality ladder in Spain.
This geographic indication was regulated by the Generalitat Valenciana (Valencian Government) on September 10, 2010.

Grape varieties
Red: Bobal, Cabernet Sauvignon, Garnacha, Merlot, Syrah and Tempranillo

External links
 Bodega Mustiguillo Web 

Spanish wine
Wine regions of Spain
Wine-related lists
Appellations